An Agraharam or Agrahara was a grant of land and royal income from it, typically by a king or a noble family in India, for religious purposes, particularly to Brahmins to maintain temples in that land or a pilgrimage site and to sustain their families. Agraharams were also known as Chaturvedimangalams in ancient times. They were also known as ghatoka, and boya. Agraharams were built and maintained by dynasties such as the Cholas and Pallavas.

The name originates from the fact that the agraharams have lines of houses on either side of the road and the temple to the village god at the centre, thus resembling a garland around the temple. According to the traditional Hindu practice of architecture and town-planning, an agraharam is held to be two rows of houses running north–south on either side of a road at one end of which would be a temple to Shiva and at the other end, a temple to Vishnu. An example is Vadiveeswaram in Tamil Nadu.

With Brahmins taking up professions in urban areas and some migrating abroad, Agraharams are vanishing fast. Many of the traditional houses are giving way to concrete structures and commercial buildings. Agraharams were started in south India during the Pallava period since they followed Vedas. Initially the Agraharam was maintained fully using royal patronage but later the Agraharam become a self-sustaining economy.

History 
The earliest existing description of an agraharam has been found in a 3rd-century AD Sangam Age work called Perumpāṇāṟṟuppaṭai.

Places with the name Agraharam or Agrahara

Andhra Pradesh 

There are a number of places in Andhra Pradesh named agraharam. These places may have originated as Bramhin-populated villages. Examples of such settlements include:

 Agraharam, Kanuru, in Peravali mandal of the West Godavari district
 Agraharam, Siddavaram, in Porumamilla mandal of Kadapa district
 Aatreyapuram Agraharam, village and a mandal in East Godavari district
 Chennupalli Agraharam, in Ballikurva mandal of Prakasam district
 Chintapalli agraharam, in Pentapadu mandal of West Godavari district
 Kotha Agraharam, in S.Rayavaram mandal of Vishakhapatnam district
 Tirumala Samudra Agraharam (T S Agraharam) in palamaner Mandal of chittoor district

Karnataka 

There are a number of places in Southern Karnataka named agrahara. These places might have, probably, originated as Brahmin villages.
 Agrahara, (near Baragur) Handikunte post, Sira taluk, Tumkur district
 Agrahara, Arkalgud, in Hassan district
 Agrahara, Arsikere, in Hassan district
 Agrahara, Channarayapatna, in Hassan district
 Agrahara, Chiknayakanhalli, in Tumkur district
 Agrahara, Chintamani, in Kolar district
 Agrahara, Holalkere, in Chitradurga district
 Agrahara, Hosadurga, in Chitradurga district
 Agrahara, Hunsur, in Mysore district
 Agrahara, Kadur, in Chikmagalur district
 Agrahara, Kanakapura, in Bangalore Rural district
 Agrahara, Koratagere, in Tumkur district
 Agrahara, Malur, in Kolar district
 Agrahara, Sandur, in Bellary district
 Agrahara, Shrirangapattana, in Mandya district
 Agrahara, Sira, in Tumkur district
 Agrahara, Srinivaspur, in Kolar district
 Agrahara Bachahalli, in Krishnarajpet taluk of Mandya district
 Agrahara Palya, in Bangalore North taluk of Bangalore district
 Agrahara Somarasanahalli, in Kola taluk of Kolar district
 Agrahara Vaddahalli, in Hosakote taluk of Bangalore Rural district
 Agrahara Valagerehalli, in Channapatna taluk of Bangalore Rural district
 Konappana Agrahara, town in Anekal taluk adjoining Electronics City
 Rupena Agrahara

Tamil Nadu 

 Annalagraharam, village in Kumbakonam taluk of Thanjavur district
 Ganapathi Agraharam, village in Thanjavur district
 Pallipalayam Agraharam, village in Namakkal district
 Devakottai Silambani Agraharam, located in Sivaganga district
 Thiruvattar Agraharam in Kanyakumari district adjascent to Adikesava Perumal Temple, Kanyakumari which is home to successors of Tuluva Brahmin priests employed by the erstwhile Travancore royal family in Trivandrum

Kerala 

There is a famous Agraharam in Thiruvananthapuram, called Valiya Sala which is the lengthiest Agraharam in India.
Agraharams in Palakkad district are around 96. When the villages are counted in the municipal area, there are around 18 of them. The concept is similar with houses in row on both sides and a temple at one end. They may differ in shapes - some are in straight line, some are T-shaped and few have multiple temples within the village.
 There are several other Agraharams in Trivandrum city including the ones in and around Padmanabhaswamy Temple, East Fort, Karamana and Ulloor.

Notes

External links
Kuzhalmannam Agraharam, one among agraharams of Palakkad where Kerala Iyers live.

Karnataka society
Tamil society
Brahmin communities